Shurabeh-ye Karim Khan (also Romanized as Shūrābeh-ye Karīm Khān) is a village in Kunani Rural District, Kunani District, Kuhdasht County, Lorestan Province, Iran. At the 2006 census, its population was 501, in 108 families.

References 

Towns and villages in Kuhdasht County